Petermannia is the sole genus of plants in the family Petermanniaceae. Petermannia cirrosa, the only species in the genus, is endemic to the states of New South Wales and Queensland in Australia. it is a prickly, wiry stemmed vine which grows to 6 metres in height and has lancelote, ovate or elliptic leaves with an acute apex. The flowers, which appear during summer,  have reflexed reddish green or white tepals. These are followed by rounded red berries.

References

Bibliography

 
 

Flora of New South Wales
Flora of Queensland
Monocots of Australia
Monotypic Liliales genera
Liliales
Taxa named by Ferdinand von Mueller